The 1920 Men's World Weightlifting Championships were held in Vienna, Austria from September 4 to September 8, 1920. There were 74 men in action from 4 nations.

Medal summary

Medal table

References
Results (Sport 123)
Weightlifting World Championships Seniors Statistics

External links
International Weightlifting Federation

World Weightlifting Championships
World Weightlifting Championships
International weightlifting competitions hosted by Austria
World Weightlifting Championships